"Awaara Hoon" is a song from the 1951 Indian film Awaara, directed by and starring Raj Kapoor, which was internationally popular. The song was written in the Hindi-Urdu language by lyricist Shailendra, and sung by Mukesh. "Awaara Hoon" immediately struck "a chord in audiences from various classes and backgrounds all over India and beyond: in China, in the Soviet Union, in the Middle East." In China, "both the song and film were said to be Chairman Mao's favourites." In a May 2013 BBC poll, the song was rated the second-greatest Bollywood song of all time.

Local versions
The popularity of "Awaara Hoon" led to the creation of localized versions of the song in Greece, Turkey, the Middle East, the Soviet Union, China, and Romania.

Example verse
The refrain of the song is "Awaara Hoon", which means "I am a vagabond/tramp", here the world vagabond symbolises the free and resilient spirit of singer and he have no sorrow or tentions on his face , his verses symbolizes hope and optimism in the world of harships . It has a catchy, rhythmic tempo with several short lines interposed with a few slightly longer ones. It is still considered to be a timeless song of much of South Asia, China, the Balkans, Russia, and Central Asia.

English translation
I am a vagabond
I am a vagabond
Or I am a star in the sky, doing its circuits
I am a vagabond
I am a vagabond
No true Home
No social world
No one loves me 
No one loves me 
now there is no longing in my heart to meet someone on the other side (most possibly referring to women by "other side") 
No one loves me
No one loves me 
i am the love of deserted towns and unknown streets 
I am a vagabond
I am a vagabond
Or I am a star in the sky, doing its circuits
I am a vagabond
I am a vagabond
Yes , i am devastated
But i sing songs of happiness
My heart is full of wounds
But still my carefree gaze laughs to fullest
World!(*2)
Your arrows
Or the fates
Have hit hard on me
I am a vagabond
I am a vagabond
Or I am a star in the sky, doing its circuits
I am a vagabond
I am a vagabond

See also
Awaara
Raj Kapoor

References

1951 songs
 
Hindi-language songs
 
Mukesh (singer) songs
Songs with lyrics by Shailendra (lyricist)
Songs with music by Shankar Jaikishan
Urdu-language songs